According to Census 2011 information the location code or village code of Ghurianan village is 035070. Ghurianan village is located in Fazilka Tehsil of Firozpur district in Punjab, India. It is situated 30km away from sub-district headquarter Fazilka and 107km away from district headquarter Firozpur. As per 2009 stats, Ghuriana is the gram panchayat of Ghurianan village.
Popular places there are : Sam Communications Digital Seva Kendra Ghuriana and Baba Bala Ji Gurudwara sahib
Total Population Of both males and females is
2,885	1,517	1,368

The total geographical area of village is 1233 hectares. Ghurianan has a total population of 2,885 peoples. There are about 552 houses in Ghurianan village. Abohar is nearest town to Ghurianan.
Ghuriana is a village in the Arniwala Sheikh Suban block of the Fazilka district, in the state of Punjab, India.

References

Villages in Firozpur district